Edmond Kramer (8 December 1906 – April 1945) was a Swiss footballer who competed in the 1924 Summer Olympics. He was a member of the Swiss team, which won the silver medal in the football tournament.

References

External links

Edmond Kramer's profile at databaseOlympics
Swiss Players in France

1906 births
1945 deaths
Association football midfielders
Swiss men's footballers
Montpellier HSC players
OGC Nice players
Ligue 1 players
Footballers at the 1924 Summer Olympics
Olympic footballers of Switzerland
Medalists at the 1924 Summer Olympics
Olympic silver medalists for Switzerland
Swiss football managers
OGC Nice managers
Switzerland international footballers
Olympic medalists in football